L. japonica  may refer to:
 Laminaria japonica,  a marine species of brown algae
Leptanilla japonica, an ant species in the genus Leptanilla
 Limnophila japonica, a crane fly species in the genus Limnophila
 Lipoptena japonica, a louse fly species in the genus Lipoptena
 Lonchoptera japonica, a spear-winged fly species in the genus Lonchoptera
 Lonicera japonica, the Japanese honeysuckle or suikazura, a flowering plant species native to eastern Asia
 Luehdorfia japonica, the Japanese luehdorfia, a butterfly species found in Japan and China

See also
 Japonica (disambiguation)